Zabie may refer to the following places:
Ząbie, Warmian-Masurian Voivodeship (north Poland)
Żabie, West Pomeranian Voivodeship (north-west Poland)
Żabie, Polish name for Verkhovyna in Ukraine